Jennifer Morgan (born April 21, 1966) is an American German environmental activist specializing in climate change policy. Since 2022, she has been serving as special representative for international climate policy of the Federal Foreign Office in Germany under minister Annalena Baerbock.

From 2016 to 2022 led the environmental protection organization Greenpeace International together with Bunny McDiarmid.

Early life and education
Morgan was born to a bank clerk and a nurse in Ridgewood, New Jersey. After school she studied political science and German from 1988 at Indiana University Bloomington. She graduated with a Bachelor of Arts degree. She then transferred to the School of International Service at American University in Washington, D.C. and studied International Relations there. She earned a Master of Arts.

Career

Early beginnings
From 1994 to 1996 Morgan served as coordinator for the US section of the Climate Action Network. She then directed WWF's Global Climate Change Program from 1998 to 2006. She then worked as Global Climate Change Director for the think tank E3G (Third Generation Environmentalism) from 2006 to 2009. From 2009 to 2016, she worked as Global Director of the Climate Program at the World Resources Institute.

Greenpeace, 2016–2022
From April 2016 Morgan served as executive director of Greenpeace International, together with Bunny McDiarmid.

In addition to these full-time tasks, Morgan worked during the German EU Council Presidency in 2007 in the advisory board of the Federal Government under the direction of the climate researcher Hans Joachim Schellnhuber and supported the Breaking the Climate Deadlock initiative of the former British Prime Minister Tony Blair since 2008. She also worked as a review editor on a chapter of the IPCC's Fifth Assessment Report and was a member of the German government's Council for Sustainable Development (Rat für Nachhaltige Entwicklung). From 2010 to 2017 she was a member of the Scientific Advisory Board of the Potsdam Institute for Climate Impact Research and is an honorary member of Germanwatch.

During that time, Morgan was a regular participant at United Nations Climate Change conferences.

Germany’s Climate Envoy, 2022–present
On February 8, 2022, it was announced that Morgan was to be appointed to the Federal Republic of Germany's Federal Foreign Office as a special representative for international climate policy. To do this, however, she had to acquire German citizenship, which she did on February 28, 2022. Her superior Baerbock formulated great expectations when she was appointed in February 2022, saying "as the helmsman, Jennifer Morgan will steer our climate foreign policy, expand partnerships with other countries around the world and conduct dialogue with civil society worldwide."

Morgan, along with Maisa Rojas, led the working group at the 2022 United Nations Climate Change Conference that came up with an agreement on loss and damage finance.

Bibliography

Articles (partial list)
 Jennifer L. Morgan, Claudio Maretti, Giulio Volpi. Tropical deforestation in the context of the post-2012 Climate Change Regime. pp. 101–110  In: Paulo Moutinho & Stephan Schwartzman (Hrsg.): Tropical Deforestation and Climate Change. Belém: IPAM/Washington DC, Environmental Defense, 2005. ISBN 858782712X https://cmapspublic3.ihmc.us/rid=1H42JRS7V-275MYTJ-F3N/4930_TropicalDeforestation_and_ClimateChange.pdf#page=101
 Jennifer Morgan. Ensuring a secure climate and energy future: Views from Civil Society. London: Chatham House (Royal Institute of International Affairs), September 2006. https://e3g.org/wp-content/uploads/Gleneagles_Views_from_Civil_Society_Sept06.pdf
 Jennifer L. Morgan, Rebecca Bertram. Changing Business and Political Climates in the US and Europe: Where is Japan? London: Third Generation Environmentalism Ltd., 2007. https://www.jstor.org/stable/resrep17772
 Stefan Rahmstorf, Jennifer Morgan, Anders Levermann, and Karsten Sach. Scientific understanding of climate change and consequences for a global deal. In: Hans Joachim Schellnhuber et al. (eds.): Global Sustainability: A Nobel Cause. Cambridge University Press, 2010. (pp. 67–80)
 Lutz Weischer, Jennifer Morgan, Milap Patel. Climate Clubs: Can Small Groups of Countries make a Big Difference in Addressing Climate Change? In: Review of European Community & International Environmental Law (RECIEL), Vol. 21, No. 3 (November 2012), pp. 177–192. https://doi.org/10.1111/reel.12007
 Jennifer Morgan, Kevin Kennedy. First Take: Looking at President Obama’s Climate Action Plan. Washington, D.C.: World Resources Institute. June 25, 2013. https://www.wri.org/insights/first-take-looking-president-obamas-climate-action-plan
Jennifer Margan. Volle Wende voraus. In: The European. June 2, 2013. https://www.theeuropean.de/jennifer-morgan/6926-globale-energiewende-und-deutsche-verantwortung
 Jennifer Morgan, Lutz Weischer. The World Needs More Energiewende. Washington, D.C.: World Resources Institute, July 30, 2013. https://www.wri.org/insights/world-needs-more-energiewende
 Jennifer Morgan, David Waskow. A new look at climate equity in the UNFCCC. In: Climate Policy, Vol. 14, No. 1 (October 2013), pp. 17–22. https://doi.org/10.1080/14693062.2014.848096
 Jennifer Morgan. 6 Functions for the International Climate Agreement. Washington, D.C.: World Resources Institute, March 17, 2014 https://www.wri.org/insights/6-functions-international-climate-agreement
 Michael I. Westphal, Pascal Canfin, Athena Ballesteros and Jennifer Morgan. Getting to $100 Billion: Climate Finance Scenarios and Projections to 2020. In: Working Paper. Washington, DC: World Resources Institute, May 2015 
 Jennifer Morgan, Eliza Northrop. Will the Paris Agreement accelerate the pace of change? In: WIREs, Vol. 8, No. 5 (September/October 2017), https://doi.org/10.1002/wcc.471

References

1966 births
Living people
American women environmentalists
American expatriates in Germany
People associated with Greenpeace
People from Ridgewood, New Jersey